Ali Rıza Pasin  (1890–1946) was a Turkish physician.

See also
List of Turkish physicians

1890 births
1946 deaths
Ottoman Military Medical Academy alumni
Ottoman military doctors
Ottoman military personnel of World War I
Military personnel of the Turkish War of Independence
20th-century Turkish physicians
20th-century physicians from the Ottoman Empire